Calvert is a given name and a surname of English, Scottish and Northern Irish origin.

People with the first name Calvert
 Calvert DeForest (1921–2007), American actor and comedian
 Calvert L. Willey (1920–1994), American food technology association administrator
 Calvert Magruder (1893–1968), Judge of the United States Court of Appeals for the First Circuit
 Calvert Watkins, American professor Emeritus of linguistics and the classics
 Calvert Vaux (1824–1895), English-American architect and landscape designer

People with the middle name Calvert
 Henry Calvert Simons (20th century), American economist
 James Calvert Spence (1892–1954), English paediatrician
 John Calvert Griffiths, British lawyer and judge, Attorney General of Hong Kong 1979–1983
 Thomas Calvert McClary (1909–1972), American writer

People with the surname Calvert
 Albert Frederick Calvert (1872–1946), English author and adventurer, leader of the Calvert Expedition in Australia
 Alexander Calvert (born 1990), Canadian actor 
 Ashton Calvert (1945–2007), senior Australian public servant
 Benedict Calvert, 4th Baron Baltimore (1679–1715), British nobleman and politician
 Benedict Leonard Calvert (1700–1732), proprietary governor of Maryland
 Benedict Swingate Calvert (1722–1788), planter, politician and Loyalist in Maryland during the American Revolution
 Bernie Calvert (born 1942), English bassist
 Caroline Calvert (1834–1872), early Australian author and naturalist
 Casey Calvert, American pornographic actress
 Casey Calvert (Hawthorne Heights), musician in the band Hawthorne Heights
 Catherine Calvert (1890–1971), American actress
 Cecil Calvert, 2nd Baron Baltimore (1605–1675), English coloniser
Cecil Calvert (politician), Unionist politician in Northern Ireland
 Charles Calvert (disambiguation) several people
 Claire Calvert (born 1988), English ballet dancer
 Clay Calvert, professor at the Pennsylvania State University
 David Calvert, unionist politician in Northern Ireland
 Eddie Calvert (1922–1978), British brass musician
Edward Calvert (architect) (c. 1847–1914), Scottish domestic architect
Edward Calvert (painter) (1799–1883), English printmaker and painter
 E. H. Calvert (1863-1941), American actor and director.
 Frank Calvert (1828–1908), Malta-born English consul and archaeologist
 Frank Calvert (cartoonist) (1876–1920) Seattle newspaperman, cartoonist 
 Frederick Calvert (disambiguation), several people
 George Calvert, 1st Baron Baltimore (1579–1632), proprietary governor of Newfoundland and founder of the Province of Maryland
 George Henry Calvert (1803–1889), American editor and writer
 George Calvert (bishop) (1900–1976), fourth Bishop of Calgary in the Anglican Church of Canada
 George Calvert (planter) (1768–1838), planter in Maryland
 Giles Calvert (1612–1663), English printer
 Greg Calvert (1937–2005), American psychotherapist and political activist, National Secretary of Students for a Democratic Society
 Harry Calvert (1763–1826), British general
 Herbert Hepburn Calvert (1870–1923), painter of Australian bird life
 James Calvert (divine) (1631–1698), English Nonconformist divine
 James Calvert (missionary) (1813–1892), British Wesleyan Methodist missionary, active in Fiji
 James Calvert (explorer) (1825–1884), British explorer and botanist, active in colonial Australia
 James F. Calvert, American captain of the first submarine to surface at the North Pole
 John Calvert (disambiguation), several people
 Ken Calvert (born 1953), American politician
 Laurence Calvert (1892–1964), English recipient of the Victoria Cross
 Leonard Calvert (1606–1647), first governor of Maryland
 Lorne Calvert (born 1954), Canadian minister and politician, premier of the province of Saskatchewan 2001–2007
 Margaret Calvert (born 1936), British typographer and graphic designer
 Matt Calvert (born 1989), Canadian ice hockey player
 Mike Calvert (1913–1998), British soldier
 Nicolson Calvert (died 1793) (c1724–1793), MP for Tewkesbury
 Nicolson Calvert (1764–1841), MP for Hertford 1802–26, and for Hertfordshire 1826–34
 Paul Calvert (disambiguation) several people
 Philip Powell Calvert (1871–1961), American entomologist
 Phill Calvert (born 1958), Australian rock drummer
 Phillip Calvert (governor) (c. 1626–1682), fifth governor of Maryland
 Phyllis Calvert (1915–2002), English film, stage and television actress
 Robert Calvert (1945–1988), South African lead singer, poet and frontman of Hawkwind
 Robert S. Calvert (1892–1981), Texas comptroller, 1949–1975
Robert W. Calvert (1905–1994), Texas politician and judge
Robert Calvert (saxophonist), English saxophonist
 Roy Calvert (1913–2002), Royal New Zealand Air Force pilot during WWII
 Samuel Calvert, Canadian soldier and politician
 Samuel Calvert (painter) (1828–1913), English engraver and painter active in Australia
 Sherry Calvert (born 1951), American javelin-thrower
 Stephen E. Calvert (born 1935), Canadian professor, geologist, and oceanographer
 Thomas Calvert (divine) (1606–1679), English Nonconformist divine
 Thomas Calvert (professor) (1775–1840), English Anglican priest and theologian
 William Calvert (Australian politician)  (1871–1942), Australian politician in Tasmania
 William Calvert (cricketer) (1839-1894), New Zealand cricketer
 William Calvert (MP) (c. 1703–1761), Lord Mayor of London 1748–49, MP for Old Sarum 1755–61 and for the City of London 1742–47
 William Samuel Calvert (1859–1930), Canadian politician

Fictional characters
 Joshua Calvert, in Peter F. Hamilton's The Night's Dawn Trilogy

See also 
 Dominic Calvert-Lewin, English footballer for Everton

English-language surnames
Surnames of Ulster-Scottish origin
Occupational surnames